Martin Réway (born 24 January 1995) is a Czech-born Slovak professional ice hockey forward who currently playing for HK Spišská Nová Ves in the Slovak Extraliga.

Playing career 
Born in Prague, Réway spent his youth career in Slovakia and with Czech side Sparta Praha, before crossing the Atlantic in 2012. He spent two seasons with the Gatineau Olympiques of the QMJHL in Canada. Réway was selected 116th overall by the Montreal Canadiens in the 2013 NHL Entry Draft as well as 102nd overall by the HC Slovan Bratislava in the 2012 KHL Junior Draft.

In 2014, Réway returned to Sparta Praha and made his debut with the men's squad in the Czech Extraliga. He started the 2015–16 season with Sparta Praha, but transferred to Fribourg-Gottéron in November 2015. He saw the ice in 19 games of the Swiss National League A (NLA), scoring eight goals while assisting on 13 more.

He signed a three-year entry-level deal with the Montreal Canadiens of the National Hockey League on 18 May 2016. However, he missed the entirety of the 2016–17 season due to injury.

In the following 2017–18 season, Réway made progress in his return to health and was reassigned to begin the year with AHL affiliate, the Laval Rocket. Having appearing in just 5 games over the first month of the season, Réway re-assessed his option and opted to mutually terminate his contract with the Canadiens in order to return home on 29 October 2017. On 8 November 2017, Réway joined Slovak KHL entrant, HC Slovan Bratislava, for the remainder of the season.

Réway returned to playing in the 2018–19 season with hometown club, MHK Dolný Kubín, in the third tier league of Slovakia before agreeing to a one-year contract for the remainder of the year with Swedish outfit, Tingsryds AIF of the HockeyAllsvenskan on 21 November 2018.

In the 2020–21 season, Réway joined fellow Slovak club, HC Košice.

International play

After playing for Slovakia at the U18 and U20 levels, Réway was selected to play for the country's men's national team at the 2014 World Championship and also made the roster for the 2016 World Championship. In 2015, he guided Slovakia's U20 team to a bronze medal at the 2015 World Junior Championships, serving as team captain.

Career statistics

Regular season and playoffs

International

References

External links

1995 births
Living people
Montreal Canadiens draft picks
Slovak expatriate ice hockey players in the Czech Republic
MHC Martin players
HC Sparta Praha players
Gatineau Olympiques players
HC Fribourg-Gottéron players
Laval Rocket players
HC Slovan Bratislava players
MHK Dolný Kubín players
Tingsryds AIF players
Rytíři Kladno players
HK Poprad players
HC Košice players
EHC Freiburg players
HK Spišská Nová Ves players
HC RT Torax Poruba players
Ice hockey people from Prague
Slovak ice hockey forwards
Slovak expatriate ice hockey players in Canada
Slovak expatriate ice hockey players in Germany
Slovak expatriate ice hockey players in Switzerland
Slovak expatriate ice hockey players in Sweden